The 1956 Florida A&M Rattlers football team was an American football team that represented Florida A&M University as a member of the Southern Intercollegiate Athletic Conference (SIAC) during the 1956 NCAA College  Division football season. In their 12th season under head coach Jake Gaither, the Rattlers compiled an 8–1 record, won the SIAC championship, and outscored opponents by a total of 406 to 98.  The team played its home games at Bragg Stadium in Tallahassee, Florida.

The Rattlers' sole loss was by two points to undefeated black college national champion Tennessee A&I before a crowd of 41,808 in the Orange Blossom Classic. Florida A&M was stopped six inches from a game-winning touchdown in the final minute of the game. Willie Galimore rushed for 127 yards and three touchdowns in the game, but also fumbled three times.

The team's statistical leaders included Galimore with 820 rushing yards, Dennis Jefferson with 708 passing yards, and Al Frazier with 405 receiving yards. Gallimore and Frazier each scored 16 touchdowns.  Frazier tallied 116 points, a single-season team scoring record that still stands. Galimore later played seven years with the Chicago Bears and was inducted into the College Football Hall of Fame.

Schedule

References

Florida AandM
Florida A&M Rattlers football seasons
Florida AandM Rattlers football